Robert Hampton Gray (AOPV 435) will be the sixth  for the Royal Canadian Navy. The class was derived from the Arctic Offshore Patrol Ship project as part of the National Shipbuilding Procurement and is primarily designed for the patrol and support of Canada's Arctic regions. It is expected to be the last naval AOPV to be built and will be followed by two more non armed vessels for the Canadian Coast Guard.

Design and construction 
The option to build the sixth ship in the series was taken up in November 2018 when the vessel was ordered. She is named for Royal Canadian Navy Lieutenant Robert Hampton Gray, the last Canadian to be awarded the Victoria Cross in World War II. The first steel for Robert Hampton Gray was cut in August 2022, starting ship construction.

References

 

Harry DeWolf-class offshore patrol vessels